

HD 163607 b is the innermost planet discovered to orbit a star HD 163607, a star somewhat brighter and older than the Sun.  It was discovered using the radial velocity method, and was initially observed as part of the N2K Program. Its minimum mass is at least three quarters of Jupiter's. It follows an eccentric orbit around the host star.

See also
Eccentric Jupiter
HD 163607 c

References

External links
 Notes on the planet HD 163607 b

Exoplanets discovered in 2011